Erik Gustaf Wersäll (14 January 1887 – 24 March 1973) was a Swedish modern pentathlete. He competed at the 1912 Summer Olympics and finished in ninth place.

Wersäll was born to the Swedish Finance Minister Claës Wersäll and Charlotta Wersäll, in a family of 10 siblings. Two of his eight brothers, Claës-Axel and Ture also competed at Summer Olympics.

References

1887 births
1973 deaths
Swedish male modern pentathletes
Olympic modern pentathletes of Sweden
Modern pentathletes at the 1912 Summer Olympics
Sportspeople from Stockholm
20th-century Swedish people